The following is a list of the players who have scored the most points during their NBA G League (formerly NBA Developmental League) careers; only points scored during regular season games are included. 

Renaldo Major is the G League's all-time leading scorer and has held the title at multiple points; in early 2014, Ron Howard surpassed Major in total points. Major later reclaimed the title on December 5, 2014, surpassing Howard's career total of 4,325. Major would play his final G League game in 2017, finishing with 5,058 career points. As of the end of the 2021–22 NBA G League season, this remains the G League's all-time scoring record.

Andre Ingram has the most career points scored (4,536) among players who are considered active by Basketball-Reference.

Scoring leaders
Statistics accurate as of July 24, 2022.

Notes

References

External media
 Renaldo Major scores 26 to become NBA D-League's all-time leading scorer! – via the NBA G League's YouTube channel

National Basketball Association lists
Scoring